Claude Trudel (born March 2, 1942) is a Canadian politician. He served as the borough mayor of Verdun in the city of Montreal, Quebec from 2002 to 2012. He was a member of the Union Montreal party.

Career
In 2001, he was elected as a Montreal city councillor as a member of Union Montreal. He was reelected in 2005 as the borough mayor of Verdun. He was named majority leader at city council, and was president of the Société de transport de Montréal. He was reelected as Verdun borough mayor in 2009, following the 2009 Montreal municipal election and quit that post on December 4, 2012, stating that he was disenchanted with the fickle nature of political life in light of the "circus" following former mayor Gérald Tremblay's departure, referring to new Montreal Mayor Michael Applebaum and what he called the "betrayal" of his fellow city councillors.

He was named to the Montreal Executive Committee as the person responsible for public safety.

Trudel served as the Quebec Liberal Party Member of the National Assembly of Quebec for the Bourget electoral district from 1985 to 1989.

Education
He studied at Collège Saint-Viateur in Outremont before receiving a law degree from Université de Montréal in 1967. He was admitted to the Bar of Quebec in 1968. He obtained a master's degree from the London School of Economics in 1969.

References

External links
 Ville de Montréal - Claude Trudel

Quebec Liberal Party MNAs
Montreal city councillors
1942 births
Université de Montréal alumni
Alumni of the London School of Economics
Lawyers in Quebec
Living people
People from Verdun, Quebec